Osinovsky is a rural locality (a khutor) in Golubinskoye Rural Settlement, Kalachyovsky District, Volgograd Oblast, Russia. The population was 78 as of 2010. There are 5 streets.

Geography 
Osinovsky is located 50 km northwest of Kalach-na-Donu (the district's administrative centre) by road. Nizhnyaya Buzinovka is the nearest rural locality.

References 

Rural localities in Kalachyovsky District